This is a comprehensive discography of official recordings by Better Than Ezra, an American alternative rock band from New Orleans, Louisiana.

Studio albums

Compilation albums

Live albums/DVDs

Extended plays

Singles

 A Charted only on the Hot 100 Airplay chart.
 B Charted only on the Bubbling Under Hot 100 chart.

Rare tracks

B-sides 
 "Circle of Friends" (1995) (Empire Records soundtrack / Surprise)
 "Know You Better" (1995) ("Good" Live B-Side)
 "Eggnog Sing-A-Long” and "Merry Christmas Eve" (1996)
 "Palace Hotel" (1996) ("Desperately Wanting" B-side)
 "Road Trip to Athens" (1996) ("King of New Orleans" B-side)

Bonus tracks 
 "Tom Collins" ("One More Murder" B-side / Japanese bonus track)
 "Screwed Up and Beautiful" (Closer reissue bonus track)
 "Simple Song" (Closer reissue bonus track)
 "Stall" (Live at the House of Blues New Orleans bonus track)
 "Cold Year" (Live at the House of Blues New Orleans bonus track)
 "Conjunction Junction" (Schoolhouse Rock! Rocks album)
 "In Between Moments" (Paper Empire iTunes exclusive bonus track)
 "Shut Up and Dance” (All Together Now digital download exclusive bonus track)

Radio, web, and streaming 

 "False River" (played live on the air at KLSU in 1993)
 "Imperfect" (Streamed on website)
 "Cars Crash" (Website download)
 "Dirty Work" (Steely Dan cover) (Website download)

 "Revolver" (Website download)
 "Chain Smokin'"
 "I Don’t Give a Damn'"

Music videos

References

Discography
Discographies of American artists
Rock music group discographies